Sofia Louise Alejandre Andres (born August 24, 1998) is a Filipino actress. She is best known for her roles in Princess and I, She's Dating the Gangster, Relaks, It's Just Pag-Ibig, Forevermore, Pusong Ligaw, Bagani and The Iron Heart. She is currently managed by Star Magic, ABS-CBN's talent management arm.

Personal life
She is close to co-Star Magic artist Michelle Vito, Claire Ruiz and Elisse Joson with whom she considers as her best friends. On March 26, 2015, she finished her high school education at ADT Montessori School located in Pasig.

In an interview with The Hive Asia, Andres stated that she has been suffering from anxiety disorder throughout her career.

She has a daughter, named Zoe (born November 24, 2019) with her current boyfriend, Daniel Miranda.

Career
Andres started as a commercial model for various brands such as Angel Evaporada and KFC. After that she was discovered by her current manager Egay Cueblo and was then cast as Dindi Maghirang in the hit series Princess and I starring Kathryn Bernardo, Daniel Padilla, Enrique Gil and Khalil Ramos.

In 2013, Sofia portrayed the role of Claire in the hit movie She's the One together with Enrique Gil, Liza Soberano, Dingdong Dantes and Bea Alonzo.

Her breakthrough role came in 2014 when she played the role of Athena Abigail Tizon in the blockbuster movie She's Dating the Gangster with Kathryn Bernardo and Daniel Padilla.

Also in 2014, she was cast in her first lead role through the movie Relaks, It's Just Pag-Ibig alongside Iñigo Pascual, Julian Estrada and Ericka Villongco. Her performance in the said film was praised by critics, citing her as one of the actresses to look forward to.

She portrayed the role of Katherine "Kate" Saavedra in the hit TV series Forevermore alongside Enrique Gil and Liza Soberano.

In July 2016, it was confirmed that Andres will be reuniting with her Forevermore co-star Diego Loyzaga in the TV series Pusong Ligaw. This project serves as her first leading role in a TV series.

Filmography

Television

Film

Music video appearances

Awards and nominations

References

External links
 

1998 births
Living people
21st-century Filipino actresses
ABS-CBN personalities
Filipino child actresses
Filipino Christians
Filipino evangelicals
Filipino film actresses
Filipino people of Spanish descent
Filipino television actresses
Star Magic personalities
Actresses from Manila